Kanagalais a village in Guntur district of the Indian state of Andhra Pradesh. It is the located in Cherukupalle mandal of Tenali revenue division.

Geography 
Kanagala is situated to the northwest of the mandal headquarters, Arumbaka,
Piped Water Supply to the village from Vellaturu channel (functional).

Demographics 

The average literacy rate stands at 68.77% with  literates. There are a total of  workers,  marginal workers and  non–workers. The workers include  cultivators,  agricultural labourers,  working in household industries and  employed in other works.

Government and politics 
Kanagala gram panchayat is the local self-government of the village. It is divided into wards and each ward is represented by a ward member.

Education 

As per the school information report for the academic year 2018–19, the village has a total of 11 schools. These schools include 8 Mandal Parishad and 3 private schools.

See also 
List of villages in Guntur district

References 

Villages in Guntur district